Orvar Säfström (born 18 February 1974) is a Swedish musician and writer, and former film reviewer and video game journalist. Together with Emma Gray, he hosted Filmkrönikan on the Swedish television network SVT from 2003 to 2006. Before that, Säfström was employed at ZTV, where he hosted two other film review shows called Bio and Recensenten.

Starting in 2006, Säfström shifted his focus more towards video games, writing and lecturing on games. Among other things he talked in the Riksdag at a seminar on gaming and received the SVEROK "Gamer of the year" award for outstanding work in promoting game culture.

Säfström is a former member of the Swedish death metal band Nirvana 2002 and sang on Entombed's 1991 EP Crawl. He has also performed live with the symphony orchestra live versions of the Entombed album Clandestine.

In 2006, he formed Underscore Productions to create symphonic concerts with game music and film music. Underscore works with major orchestras in Scandinavia such as the Royal Stockholm Philharmonic Orchestra and the Swedish Radio Symphony Orchestra, and have produced concert series like SCORE (game music), WE COME IN PEACE (science fiction music) SAGAS (fantasy music) and THE HORROR (horror music).

Säfström is a published writer, having written three books on the 1980s roleplaying game wave in Sweden. In 2017, he formed the publishing house Fandrake with fellow writer Jimmy Wilhelmsson to publish coffee table books dealing with fandom subjects.

References

Swedish film critics
Swedish heavy metal singers
Swedish television personalities
Swedish male writers
1974 births
Living people
21st-century Swedish singers
Entombed (band) members
Place of birth missing (living people)